Ngayon at Kailanman (International title: Until Forever / 
) is a 2009 Philippine television drama romance series broadcast by GMA Network. Based on a 1992 Philippine film of the same title, the series is the fourteenth installment of Sine Novela. Directed by Mike Tuviera, it stars Heart Evangelista and JC de Vera. It premiered on June 8, 2009 on the network's Dramarama sa Hapon line up replacing Paano Ba ang Mangarap?. The series concluded on September 25, 2009 with a total of 80 episodes. It was replaced by Kaya Kong Abutin ang Langit in its timeslot.

Cast and characters

Lead cast
Heart Evangelista as Ayra Noche-Torres (Villaflor)
JC De Vera as Edwin Torres

Supporting cast
Arci Muñoz as Donna Benitez
Dion Ignacio as Dags de Leon
Luis Alandy as Ronald Noche
Boom Labrusca as William
Yayo Aguila as Melissa Noche
Bernard Palanca as Rafa Villaflor
Mel Kimura as Luding
Dexter Doria as Inya Benitez
Ramon Christopher as Leo Cruz
Angeli Nicole Sanoy as Sabrina Villaflor
Pen Medina as Vener Torres

Guest cast
Charlie Davao as Artemio Noche
Shiela Marie Rodriguez as Mitch
Gail Lardizabal as Grace

Ratings
According to AGB Nielsen Philippines' Mega Manila household television ratings, the pilot episode of Ngayon at Kailanman earned a 21.1% rating. While the final episode scored a 20.2% rating.

References

External links
 

2009 Philippine television series debuts
2009 Philippine television series endings
Filipino-language television shows
GMA Network drama series
Live action television shows based on films
Philippine romance television series
Television shows filmed in the Philippines